Aerides crispa is a species of epiphytic orchid native to western India.

References

crispa
Orchids of India
Epiphytic orchids
Plants described in 1833